Szostaki  is a village in the administrative district of Gmina Kodeń, within Biała Podlaska County, Lublin Voivodeship, in eastern Poland, close to the border with Belarus. Szostaki is located in south-central Poland and is 5 km from Radoszyce. It also lies 22 km from Końskie. The population is 160.

References

Villages in Biała Podlaska County